Renova may refer to:

Cities, towns, townships etc.
Renova, Mississippi
Renova: an unincorporated settlement in Dexter Township, Minnesota

Brand names
 Renova (brand), a Portuguese paper products company
 Trade name of tretinoin, a treatment for acne and other skin conditions
 Renova Group, a Russian holding company controlled by Viktor Vekselberg

Other
 FK Renova, football club
Renova (fish), a killifish genus